The men's 110 metres hurdles at the 2019 World Athletics Championships was held at the Khalifa International Stadium in Doha from 30 September to 2 October.

Summary
Five athletes returned from the 2017 final, the defending champion and Olympic champion Omar McLeod, silver medalist Sergey Shubenkov, Olympic silver medalist Orlando Ortega, Devon Allen and Shane Brathwaite, added as a 9th finalist after he was interfered with in the semi finals when Ronald Levy drifted out of his lane.

In the final, McLeod and American collegian Grant Holloway got out even, but by the second hurdle, Holloway was edging ahead with Ortega the next behind.  Holloway was gaining a little on every hurdle, and by the fourth, Pascal Martinot-Lagarde was even with Ortega.  As Holloway's lead extended, McLeod pressed.  McLeod rattled the eighth hurdle.  Ortega again was slightly ahead of Martinot-Lagarde, but Shubenkov was also there moving fast on the outside.  McLeod hit the 9th with his foot flat, losing his balance while running at full speed.  He popped up trying to get over the final barrier, bumping Ortega to his right as he failed, crashing to the track.  Holloway won by a metre with Shubenkov beating Martinot-Lagarde to the line.  After the bump, Ortega managed to stay upright, crossing the line in fifth, his arms outstretched as if asking what could be done after he was interfered with.

Holloway continued celebrating all the way through the first turn and half way down the backstretch before dramatically flopping to the track on his back. McLeod was disqualified for interference.  After the race, Spain filed a protest and Ortega was awarded a second bronze medal.

Records
Before the competition records were as follows:

The following records were set at the competition:

Qualification standard
The standard to qualify automatically for entry was 13.46.

Schedule
The event schedule, in local time (UTC+3), was as follows:

Results

Heats
The first four in each heat (Q) and the next four fastest (q) qualified for the semi-finals.

Semi-finals
The first two in each heat (Q) and the next two fastest (q) qualify for the final.

Final
The final was started on 2 October at 23:00.

References

110 hurdles
Sprint hurdles at the World Athletics Championships